The Women's 49 is a competition featured at the 2011 World Taekwondo Olympic Qualification Tournament, and was held at the Sarhadchi Olympic Center in Baku, Azerbaijan on July 2. The first three ranked athletes qualify their NOCs a place each at the 2012 Olympic Games.

Medalists

Results
Legend
DQ — Won by disqualification
WD — Won by withdrawal

Finals

Top half

Section 1

Section 2

Bottom half

Section 3

Section 4

References
Draw

Women's 49
Olymp